Zoran Lončar (born 13 December 1966) is a Serbian former footballer who played as a striker.

Club career
Lončar made his senior debut with OFK Beograd during the 1984–85 Yugoslav Second League, as the club earned promotion to the Yugoslav First League. He amassed a total of 168 appearances and scored 68 goals for the side in the nation's top two leagues combined over the course of eight seasons. In the summer of 1992, following the breakup of Yugoslavia, Lončar moved to Greece and signed with Aris Thessaloniki. He spent the next four years with the club, making 99 appearances and scoring 35 goals in the top flight of Greek football. In the summer of 1997, Lončar returned to OFK Beograd and spent two more seasons with the Romantičari.

International career
Between 1984 and 1985, Lončar represented Yugoslavia during the 1986 UEFA European Under-18 Championship qualifying, making two appearances as a substitute.

Post-playing career
Between 2012 and 2013, Lončar served as sporting director for OFK Beograd, before becoming assistant manager to Zoran Milinković at Aris Thessaloniki. They subsequently worked together at Voždovac and Partizan. In November 2015, Lončar returned to OFK Beograd as sporting director.

Career statistics

Honours
OFK Beograd
 Yugoslav Second League: 1984–85

References

External links
 
 

Aris Thessaloniki F.C. non-playing staff
Aris Thessaloniki F.C. players
Association football forwards
Expatriate footballers in Greece
First League of Serbia and Montenegro players
FK Hajduk Beograd players
FK Partizan non-playing staff
Footballers from Belgrade
OFK Beograd players
Serbia and Montenegro expatriate footballers
Serbia and Montenegro expatriate sportspeople in Greece
Serbia and Montenegro footballers
Serbian football managers
Serbian footballers
Super League Greece players
Yugoslav First League players
Yugoslav footballers
1966 births
Living people